Gosnel Cupid (born 9 July 1963) is a Vincentian cricketer. He played in seven first-class and three List A matches for the Windward Islands in 1993/94 and 1994/95.

See also
 List of Windward Islands first-class cricketers

References

External links
 

1963 births
Living people
Saint Vincent and the Grenadines cricketers
Windward Islands cricketers